The 1907 Copa del Rey Final was the 5th final of the Copa del Rey, the Spanish football cup competition. The match took place on 30 March 1907 at the Hipódromo, Madrid. The match was contested by Club Bizcaya and Madrid FC.

This match was not a scheduled final: the tournament was a round-robin tournament, but both teams finished with six points, thus forcing a playoff match to decide the champion.

Madrid FC lifted the trophy for the third time in a row and thus keeping the trophy. The only goal of the game was scored by Manuel Prast.

Match details

|}

References

External links
RSSSF.com

1907
Copa
Club Bizcaya matches
Real Madrid CF matches